The 2018 German Indoor Athletics Championships was the 65th edition of the national championship in indoor track and field for Germany. It was held on 17–18 February at the Helmut-Körnig-Halle in Dortmund – the eleventh time the venue had hosted the championships. A total of 24 events, 12 for men and 12 for women, were contested plus four further events were held separately. It was to serve as preparation for the 2018 IAAF World Indoor Championships. 

Several national championship events were staged elsewhere: 3 × 800 m and 3 × 1000 m relays were held on 25 February at the Sporthalle Brandberge in Halle, while racewalking events were hosted in Erfurt on 2 March. Indoor combined events were not held that year as the event did not find an organiser.

Konstanze Klosterhalfen of TSV Bayer 04 Leverkusen set a German indoor record in the women's 3000 metres, clocking 8:36.01 minutes.

Results

Men

Women

References

Results
 Information zur DM from leichtathletik.de
 Medallists (pdf 209 kB)
 Results (pdf 247 kB)

German Indoor Athletics Championships
German Indoor Athletics Championships
German Indoor Athletics Championships
German Indoor Athletics Championships
Sports competitions in Dortmund